Emperor Fei or Fèidì is a term for deposed Chinese emperors. It may refer to:

 Emperor Fei of Jin (342–386, r.365–371)
 Emperor Qianfei of Liu Song (449–465, r.464–465) (Qian means previous)
 Emperor Houfei of Liu Song (463–477, r.472–477) (Hou means later)
 Xiao Baojuan, Emperor Fei of Southern Qi (483–501, r.498–501)
Emperor Jiemin of Northern Wei, Emperor Qianfei of Northern Wei (498–532, r.531)
 Emperor Fei of Northern Qi (545–561, r.559–560)
 Yuan Lang, Emperor Houfei of Northern Wei (513–532, r.531–532)
 Emperor Fei of Western Wei (died 554, r.554)
 Emperor Fei of Chen (554–570, r.566–568)
 Li Congke, Emperor Fei of Later Tang (887–937, r.934–937)

See also
 Emperor Phế